The Paraguayan Regional Workers' Federation (FORP) was the first union federation in Paraguay, founded in 1906.

See also 

 Anarchism in Paraguay
 Anarcho-syndicalism

References

Further reading 
 
 
 

1906 establishments in Paraguay
Anarchism in Paraguay
Syndicalist trade unions
Trade unions in Paraguay
Trade unions established in 1906
Trade unions disestablished in 1915